Christina Honsel (born 7 July 1997) is a German athlete specialising in the high jump. She represented her country at the  2019 World Championships without qualifying for the final. Earlier that year she won a silver medal at the 2019 European U23 Championships.

Her personal bests in the event are 1.92 metres outdoors (Gävle 2019) and 1.98 metres indoors (Leipzig 2023).

International competitions

References

External links
Official website

1997 births
Living people
People from Dorsten
German female high jumpers
World Athletics Championships athletes for Germany
German national athletics champions
LG Olympia Dortmund athletes